The Department of Intergovernmental Affairs is a part of the Government of New Brunswick, Canada.  It is charged with the relations between New Brunswick and other provinces, the federal government, and for international relations such as its involvement in the Council of New England Governors and Eastern Canadian Premiers and La Francophonie.

The department was established on June 21, 1999 when Premier Bernard Lord took office.  On  April 1, 2003, wanting to expand the province's involvement in foreign policy, the name was changed to the Department of Intergovernmental and International Relations.  On February 14, 2006, it was returned to the name of Intergovernmental Affairs.

Ministers

External links
Department of Intergovernmental Affairs

New Brunswick
Foreign relations of Canada
Intergovernmental Affairs
Ministries established in 1999
1999 establishments in New Brunswick